The 2014–15 season was APOEL's 75th season in the Cypriot First Division and 87th year in existence as a football club.

Season review

Head coach changes
January 2015: On 6 January 2015, APOEL and Giorgos Donis parted company by mutual agreement after a poor run of performances and results, culminating in a 1–1 home draw against the last-placed Ayia Napa. Giorgos Donis was replaced by German coach Thorsten Fink, who (on 10 January 2015) signed a contract until the end of the 2014–15 season, with the option of a further season.

May 2015: On 11 May 2015, one day after a questionable 1–0 loss to Apollon Limassol and following a run of disappointing performances, Thorsten Fink was sacked by APOEL, although at that moment the team were two points clear at the top of the league with only two matches remaining. The same day, APOEL's technical director Gustavo Manduca, who only hung up his boots last month, took over as caretaker manager for the team's crucial final two league games of the season, as well as the Cypriot Cup final, alongside assistant coach Giorgos Kostis and former skipper Marinos Satsias.

Pre-season and friendlies
The first training session for the season took place on 27 June 2014 at THOI Lakatamia stadium. On 2 July 2014, the team flew to Gdańsk in Poland to perform the main stage of their pre-season training and returned to Cyprus on 19 July 2014. During the pre-season training stage in Poland, APOEL played three friendly matches against Žalgiris Vilnius, Lechia Gdańsk and Arka Gdynia. APOEL drew 1–1 with Žalgiris Vilnius and won both Lechia Gdańsk and Arka Gdynia by 2–1. After their return to Cyprus the team played two friendly matches, beating Greek side Ergotelis 2–0 at GSP Stadium and Doxa Katokopias 3–0 at Makario Stadium. Also, during the fifteen-day break between the third qualifying round and the play-off round of the UEFA Champions League in August, APOEL played three more friendlies, beating Othellos 3–1 and Ayia Napa 2–1 and losing 1–2 against Othellos.

Cypriot Super Cup
On 13 August 2014, APOEL lost 1–2 to Ermis Aradippou at Antonis Papadopoulos Stadium in the super cup final. Jonatas Belusso opened the scoring for Ermis after just eight seconds, taking advantage of Mário Sérgio's mistake. APOEL managed to equalize in the second minute of the stoppage time, when Dragan Žarković put the ball in his own net from an Efstathios Aloneftis corner kick. However, the match was not over. With the game being in the fifth minute of the stoppage time and set for penalties, Giannis Taralidis with a direct free kick struck the ball beyond the reach of Tassos Kissas for an epic finish, handing Ermis victory in their first ever Super Cup appearance.

Cypriot First Division

Regular season
APOEL's opening Cypriot First Division match against Anorthosis was originally scheduled on 23 August 2014, but was postponed and rescheduled to 24 September 2014, because of APOEL's UEFA Champions League play-off matches against Aalborg BK. On 31 August 2014, APOEL opened their competitive season with an important 2–0 win at GSZ Stadium against AEK Larnaca. Gustavo Manduca, who came on as a 56th-minute substitute, opened the proceedings in the 58th minute and scored a second goal in the last minute of the match, to clinch three vital points for his team. On 13 September 2014, four days before the historical UEFA Champions League match against Barcelona at Camp Nou, APOEL struggled to pick up a 1–0 win at home over Ermis Aradippou. The match was deadlocked until the 88th minute, when Cillian Sheridan finally grabbed the winner from close range, after Vinícius' left-wing cross. On 20 September 2014, APOEL came away with three points, making it three wins out of three games with a 3–1 victory at Ayia Napa. APOEL managed to go ahead 3–0 from the first half with goals by Constantinos Charalambides in the 10th minute, Pieros Sotiriou two minutes later and Gustavo Manduca in the 36th minute. They also managed to hang on, despite being down to 10 men from the 39th minute after Kaká conceded a penalty and was shown the red card. Ayia Napa, which missed the penalty they won in the first half, was able only to pull one back with Vasil Panayotov in the 63rd minute. On 24 September 2014 – in the first matchweek match which was postponed and rescheduled – APOEL beat Anorthosis 2–0 at home and moved three points clear at the top of the table. APOEL had to wait until the 65th minute to open the scoring through Gustavo Manduca, with Efstathios Aloneftis sealing the win 15 minutes from time after taking the rebound from Gustavo Manduca's missed penalty. On 27 September 2014, APOEL dropped their first points of the season, their perfect four-game opening ended by a 0–0 draw against AEL Limassol at GSP Stadium. On 6 October 2014, APOEL came from behind to beat Othellos 2–1 at Antonis Papadopoulos Stadium. Thiago gave Othellos the lead in the 54th minute after a mistake from John Arne Riise, before the Norwegian defender made amends by supplying a sublime cross for Gustavo Manduca's equaliser ten minutes later. Algerian striker Rafik Djebbour opened his goalscoring account for APOEL five minutes before the end, netting the winner with a powerful header after Cillian Sheridan's cross. On 26 October 2014, Rafik Djebbour's header in the 26th minute was enough to give APOEL a 1–0 win over Nea Salamina at GSP Stadium and continue their impressive start to the season. On 1 November 2014, APOEL crushed Ethnikos Achna 4–0 at Dasaki Stadium and remained unbeaten, four points clear at the top of the table. Cillian Sheridan scored twice in the beginning of each half, with Nektarios Alexandrou adding a third and leading scorer Gustavo Manduca getting the fourth. On 10 November 2014, APOEL were held to a goalless draw by Doxa Katokopias at GSP Stadium and their gap ahead of second placed Apollon Limassol was reduced to 2 points. APOEL missed a great chance to grab the three points when Gustavo Manduca's penalty was saved by Doxas' goalkeeper three minutes before the end. On 21 November 2014, APOEL were held again to a goalless draw by second-placed Apollon Limassol at Tsirion Stadium and remained unbeaten in the Cypriot top flight, two points clear at the top of the table. On 30 November 2014, APOEL beat arch-rivals Omonia 1–0 at GSP Stadium, with ex-Omonia midfielder Giorgos Efrem scoring the vital winner in the 38th minute after an amazing backheel pass by Gustavo Manduca. On 5 December 2014, APOEL squeezed past Anorthosis at Antonis Papadopoulos Stadium with a 1–0 victory thanks to a Rafik Djebbour goal nine minutes from time. At the same time, AEK Larnaca humbled second-placed Apollon 3–1 thus allowing APOEL to extend their lead at the top of the Cyprus league to five points. On 15 December 2014, APOEL drew 4–4 with AEK Larnaca in a fascinating match at GSP Stadium and maintained their lead in the standings, but the gap over second-placed Apollon was reduced to three points. AEK took the lead just after 13 minutes with Nikos Englezou, but Rafik Djebbour equalized four minutes later with a volley inside the box. AEK score a second one thanks to a José Kanté header in the 20th minute and just before the break they extended their lead to two goals through a strike from distance by Jorge Larena. One minute after the break, APOEL reduced the deficit to one goal with Rafik Djebbour scoring his second of the match, heading in Mário Sérgio's corner. Nine minutes later, however, AEK extended their lead to two goals again with José Kanté finishing from close range, before Gustavo Manduca miss a penalty for APOEL in the 73rd minute. However, Pieros Sotiriou who came on as a second-half substitute, was the hero for APOEL scoring twice in the last five minutes. He first scored with a sliding volley in the 85th minute and five minutes later he placed the ball into the bottom corner from just outside the box to give APOEL a hard-earned point. On 20 December 2014, APOEL's unbeaten run came to an end as they lost 2–1 away to Ermis Aradippou. The Cypriot First Division leaders went 13 games unbeaten prior to this match but went into the winter break suffering their first league loss, allowing Apollon Limassol to go level on points with them. Pieros Sotiriou put APOEL in front after just six minutes, but Ifeanyi Onyilo scored in the beginning of the second half and in the last minute of the match, to give Ermis the three points. On 5 January 2015, APOEL's winless run continued after an unexpected 1–1 home draw against the last-placed Ayia Napa. Giorgos Efrem broke the deadlock for APOEL after 60 minutes before Georgios Kolokoudias hit back with a stunning free-kick in the last minute of the match. One day later, APOEL parted company with coach Giorgos Donis, following the team's poor run of performances and results. On 11 January 2015, under caretaker coach Savvas Paraskeva, APOEL suffered a 2–1 away defeat against AEL Limassol and dropped to the 2nd place for the first time in the season. A brace of second half goals from Nigerian striker Marco Tagbajumi cancelled out John Arne Riise's early opener and condemned APOEL to their second loss in the season. On 11 January 2015, under new coach Thorsten Fink, APOEL extended their winless run to five games after a 1–1 home draw with Othellos and remained in the second place, three points behind leaders Apollon. Othellos took the lead in the 50th minute with Elgujja Grigalashvili's long shot and Rafik Djebbour equalized eight minutes later after receiving a long pass from João Guilherme. In the fourth minute of the added time Marios Antoniades hit the bar with a close header and APOEL missed a great chance to win the three points. On 31 January 2015, Rafik Djebbour's fifth-minute goal proved to be enough for APOEL as they beat Nea Salamina 1–0 at Ammochostos Stadium and ended their five-game winless run. APOEL could score more goals as they missed several chances, including a lost penalty by Rafik Djebbour in the 22nd minute which was saved by Salamina's goalkeeper Ram Strauss. On 7 February 2015, APOEL continued their improving performances under Thorsten Fink with a comfortable 4–0 win over Ethnikos Achna at GSP Stadium. APOEL opened the scoring in the 19th minute through Martin Lanig and three minutes after the break John Arne Riise scored a volley to double his team's lead. In the 73rd minute, Giorgos Efrem chipped the ball past the oncoming Mathieu Valverde to extend APOEL's lead to three goals and two minutes later Rafik Djebbour scored his eighth league goal in the season to make it 4–0. On 14 February 2015, APOEL recorded their third consecutive league victory after beating Doxa Katokopias 2–0 at Makario Stadium, thanks to an early goal by John Arne Riise and an own goal by João Leonardo. On 21 February 2015, APOEL secured a dramatic last minute 1–0 win over title rivals Apollon Limassol at GSP Stadium and moved to the top of the table, level on points with Apollon. Despite playing the final 20 minutes a man down after Kaká’s dismissal, APOEL secured the valuable three points in the last minute of the added time with Nuno Morais netting the winner with a close-range header after Rafik Djebbour's cross from the left. On 28 February 2015, APOEL were held to a 1–1 draw by Omonia and finished the regular season in 2nd place, two points behind leaders Apollon Limassol. APOEL went ahead on the half hour mark with Nuno Morais who finished off Constantinos Charalambides deep free-kick inside the box, but Omonia equalized eight minutes from time when Gaossou Fofana blasted the ball past Urko Pardo after a poor defensive clearance.

Play-offs
On 7 March 2015, in its first Championship play-off match, APOEL beat Anorthosis 1–0 at GSP Stadium and moved to the top of the league table, one point ahead of Apollon. APOEL produced one of their best performances since Thorsten Fink took over in January 2015, and got the three points thanks to a fortuitous John Arne Riise cross that was deflected over the visitors keeper Thomas Kaminski, just after the half hour mark. On 14 March 2015, APOEL were held to a 1–1 draw by Omonia and Apollon took advantage of APOEL's draw to move one point clear at the top of the table after beating AEK Larnaca. Omonia took the lead in the sixth minute when André Schembri managed to squeeze the ball past the unsighted APOEL keeper Dionisis Chiotis and Rafik Djebbour headed the equalizer for APOEL in the 37th minute after receiving a Constantinos Charalambides' cross from the right. In the top-of-the-table clash on 21 March 2015, APOEL and Apollon shared the spoils with a 2–2 draw at GSP Stadium, with all four goals being scored in the first half. Despite a host of players missing, APOEL had twice taken the lead, first through Tiago Gomes and then through new signing Valmir Nafiu but they were twice pegged back through Gastón Sangoy's penalty and then through Fotis Papoulis who took advantage of a slip at APOEL's defense. On 4 April 2015, APOEL suffered their first defeat under German coach Thorsten Fink after going down 1–0 to AEK Larnaca at GSZ Stadium and remained one point behind Apollon, who also lost 3–1 at home to Anorthosis. The only goal of the game came six minutes before half-time after a string of errors in APOEL's backline allowed forward Nestoras Mitidis to beat Dionisis Chiotis from just inside the penalty box, while APOEL went down to 10 men in the 58th minute after Carlão received a second yellow card. On 19 April 2015, APOEL returned to the top of the table following their easy 3–0 home win against Ermis Aradippou and Apollon's 1–0 defeat by Omonia. An early strike from Martin Lanig followed by a goal in each half from Rafik Djebbour, sent APOEL two points clear at the top of the table with five games left to go in the end-of-season playoffs. On 25 April 2015, APOEL came from behind three times to earn a thrilling 3–3 draw against Anorthosis at Antonis Papadopoulos Stadium and remained top of the table as all other championship play-off matches ended also in draw. Former APOEL striker Esmaël Gonçalves gave the Anorthosis the lead twice in the first half, with Constantinos Charalambides and Georgios Efrem answering for APOEL in the first half and early in the second half respectively. Andreas Makris restored the lead for Anorthosis in the second half, before a late Jason Demetriou own goal restored parity. APOEL, who hit the post three times, could have clinched it deep into injury time but their top scorer Rafik Djebbour blasted over from close range with the goal gaping. On 2 May 2015, APOEL defeated arch rivals Omonia 3–2 at GSP Stadium and widened its lead at the top of the table to five points after Apollon went down 0–2 to AEK Larnaca. APOEL had taken a first-half lead against ten-men Omonia, who saw Ucha Lobjanidze receive a double-booking in quick succession for a foul and then dissent, through Tomás De Vincenti's penalty in the 37th minute. Omonia made a comeback in the 54th minute and equalised with Nuno Assis, who kept up his scoring form soon after netted his second goal to give his team the lead in the 56th minute. Nektarios Alexandrou leveled proceedings three minutes later, before Rafik Djebbour bundled home John Arne Riise's header in the fourth minute of stoppage time, helping APOEL to take a giant leap towards sealing the 24th league title in their history. On 10 May 2015, APOEL lost 1–0 to Apollon Limassol in a scrappy top of the table clash at Tsirion Stadium thanks to a Fotis Papoulis winner in the 67th minute. The win brought Apollon with two points of leaders APOEL, just two matches before the end of the season. On 11 May 2015, one day after the team's loss to Apollon and following a run of disappointing performances, Thorsten Fink was sacked by APOEL, although at that moment the team were at the top of the league, with only two matches remaining. The same day, APOEL's technical director Gustavo Manduca, who only hung up his boots last month, took over as caretaker manager for the team's crucial final two league games of the season, as well as the Cypriot Cup final, alongside assistant coach Giorgos Kostis and former skipper Marinos Satsias. On 16 May 2015, APOEL missed out on the chance to celebrate their 24th league title after battling to a 1–1 draw with AEK Larnaca, but the gap over second-placed Apollon (who lost to Anorthosis) was increased to three points, meaning that now APOEL was needing only a draw in their final game at Ermis Aradippou to lift the trophy. Gustavo Manduca made his debut in the dugout for APOEL since taking over as caretaker manager after the dismissal of Thorsten Fink and got his first taste of pressure on the bench when Serbian midfielder Vladimir Boljević scored from the penalty spot to give AEK Larnaca the lead after just 12 minutes. Tomás De Vincenti levelled the score in the 24th minute after converting a penalty won by Brazilian defender Kaká, while APOEL missed a great chance to win the league title when Cillian Sheridan's 77th minute shot came off the post and Efstathios Aloneftis couldn't strike home the rebound. On 24 May 2015, APOEL secured their third consecutive championship title and their second double in a row after beating Ermis Aradippou 4–2 at Ammochostos Stadium on the last day of the season. APOEL got off to a perfect start when Tomás De Vincenti opened the score with a low drive in the 9th minute and Constantinos Charalambides doubled the score soon after. Giannis Taralidis pulled one back for Ermis after 15 minutes, but APOEL restored their two-goal cushion through their top scorer Rafik Djebbour who scored from the penalty spot five minutes later. In the 39th minute, Rafik Djebbour scored his second of the day after good work by Nuno Morais to give APOEL a three goals half-time lead. Former APOEL forward Andreas Papathanasiou made it 4–2 immediately after half-time, but there was no spoiling the party which was already underway in the stands as APOEL were crowned champions for the 24th time in their history.

Cypriot Cup

Second round
APOEL won the Cypriot cup last season and as such entered the second round of the competition. APOEL were drawn to face Cypriot Second Division side Olympiakos Nicosia. On 14 January 2015, in (new coach) Thorsten Fink's debut, APOEL secured a narrow 1–0 advantage over Olympiakos at Makario Stadium thanks to a Rafik Djebbour goal from the penalty spot in the 73rd minute. On 28 January 2015, APOEL reached a comfortable 3–0 home win over Olympiakos for an aggregate 4–0 victory, thanks to goals from Tomás De Vincenti, Cillian Sheridan and Giorgos Efrem.

Quarter-finals
APOEL were drawn to face Anorthosis in the quarter-finals of the Cypriot Cup. In the first leg of their Cypriot Cup quarter-finals clash on 4 March 2015, Anorthosis and APOEL produced an enthralling 0–0 draw at Antonis Papadopoulos Stadium, with both teams missing some great chances to win the game. Despite of Thorsten Fink decided to rest many first-team players in the second leg, APOEL went through to the semi-finals of the Cypriot Cup after an easy 2–0 win over Anorthosis at GSP Stadium. Algerian star Rafik Djebbour was the hero, coming on as a 62nd-minute substitute and scoring twice after 67 and 80 minutes.

Semi-finals
APOEL were drawn to face arch rivals Omonia in the semi-finals of the Cypriot Cup. On 8 April 2015, APOEL trashed Omonia 3–0 in the first leg of their semi-final clash and took a giant step in the defence of their Cypriot Cup title. Martin Lanig gave APOEL the lead after 35 minutes, with former Liverpool star John Arne Riise making it 2–0 just four minutes later and Tomás De Vincenti adding a third 12 minutes from time. On 22 April 2015, APOEL moved into their second successive Cypriot Cup final after riding out an easy 0–0 away draw against rivals Omonia to advance 3–0 on aggregate.

Final
On 20 May 2015, APOEL clinched their 21st Cypriot Cup title and their second in successive seasons with a convincing 4–2 victory over AEL Limassol at GSZ Stadium in Larnaca. APOEL fell behind to an early Maic Sema goal, but Tomás De Vincenti drew the sides level after 31 minutes, beating goalkeeper Karim Fegrouche with a clever 35-meter lob direct from a free-kick. Giorgos Efrem put APOEL in front just before half-time, poking the ball in from close range, and the Cyprus international was on target again immediately after the interval, curling into the empty net after Karim Fegrouche came rushing off his line. Former Liverpool FC defender John Arne Riise drilled in a trademark 30-meter thunderbolt free-kick goal on the hour to put the contest beyond doubt for a side now on the verge of a second successive double and Valentinos Sielis just scored a late consolation to make the final score 4–2.

UEFA Champions League

Third qualifying round
APOEL won the Cypriot league last season and as such entered the third qualifying round of the 2014–15 UEFA Champions League. APOEL started their campaign against Finnish side HJK Helsinki.

On 30 July 2014, APOEL came from two goals down to hold HJK Helsinki to a 2–2 draw at Sonera Stadium in the first leg of their third qualifying round tie. Demba Savage scored twice in the first half, breaking the deadlock after 11 minutes and converting a penalty on the cusp of the interval to stun APOEL. Macoumba Kandji's second yellow card shortly after the restart undermined the hosts' good work, and APOEL ruthlessly wiped out the advantage with two goals in four minutes. Tomás De Vincenti put APOEL back in contention with a header after 71 minutes, before then setting up Cillian Sheridan three minutes later to put the Nicosia club back in the driving seat ahead of the second leg at Nicosia.

On 6 August 2014, APOEL sealed their passage to the play-off round with a comfortable 2–0 win over HJK Helsinki at GSP Stadium. The game's opening goal came when Tomás De Vincenti won possession in midfield and quickly released Cillian Sheridan who showed great composure in slotting the ball past Michael Tørnes in the HJK goal. The dangerous Tomás De Vincenti doubled his side's lead in the 43rd minute, when he was caught by a high foot in the area and converted the penalty himself. APOEL continued to press in the second half and were unlucky not to add to their lead through Vinícius, the midfielder seeing his shots hitting the bar twice. The win guaranteed that APOEL would feature in the group stages of a European competition for the fourth time in six years, as even if they were to suffer defeat in the play-off round, they would go directly into the UEFA Europa League group stage.

Play-off round
APOEL were drawn to face Danish champions Aalborg BK in the play-off round of the Champions League, as they attempt to reach the group stages for the third time in their history.

On 20 August 2014, APOEL came from behind to earn a valuable 1–1 draw against Aalborg at Nordjyske Arena in the first leg of their Champions League play-off round tie. A 16th-minute strike from Nicolaj Thomsen gave Aalborg a well-merited lead, but Brazilian midfielder Vinícius handed APOEL a 54th-minute equaliser, as well as an away goal which could prove decisive early into the second half.

On 26 August 2014, APOEL crushed Aalborg 4–0 at GSP Stadium and secured their place in the group stage of the UEFA Champions League for the third time in their history. APOEL consolidated their advantage just before the half-hour when Tomás De Vincenti cut the ball back from out on the wing to the awaiting Vinícius on the edge of the area and the Brazilian scored with a neat strike which wrong-footed the keeper to give APOEL a vital lead. Mário Sérgio's out-swinging corner was met by Tomás De Vincenti who crept in unmarked to hit home from the edge of the six-yard box into the roof of the net, giving APOEL a two-goal cushion one minute before the break. Efstathios Aloneftis, who came on in the 61st minute, put away APOEL's third goal three minutes later, after he brought down João Guilherme's sweeping cross-field ball and stroke the ball across goal and into the corner. The crowning fourth goal was similarly direct, Cillian Sheridan beating Rasmus Thelander to Urko Pardo's long kick forward and cutting on to his left foot to outgun Nicolai Larsen from the edge of the box, ensuring APOEL go into group stage draw full of confidence.

Group stage

Seeded in Pot 4 for the group stage draw, APOEL drawn in Group F, alongside Barcelona, Paris Saint-Germain and Ajax.

On 17 September 2014, APOEL opened their Champions League campaign with a 1–0 defeat against Barcelona at Camp Nou, but left the Catalan capital with all the plaudits following a stellar display which so nearly earned a historic result. APOEL defended solidly and did well to thwart Barca's formidable strike force, while occasionally threatening the home goal. Barcelona found the breakthrough when Gerard Piqué headed Lionel Messi's free kick into the bottom corner of the net in the 28th minute. Lionel Messi came close to scoring when he stung APOEL goalkeeper Urko Pardo's fingers with a rasping strike from Neymar's layoff five minutes before the break and was denied by a superb last-ditch block by Mário Sérgio at the death. In a frantic finish to an otherwise dull affair, APOEL had their best opening of the match moments later and Barca goalkeeper Marc-André ter Stegen had to be alert to palm away Gustavo Manduca's powerful effort and preserve Barça's 1–0 lead. On 30 September 2014, APOEL secured their first point in Group F, after a 1–1 draw against Ajax at GSP Stadium. Ajax opened the scoring in the 28th minute when Danish forward Lucas Andersen slotted home the rebound after APOEL goalkeeper Urko Pardo had parried a close-range effort from Lasse Schöne. However, Ajax lead did not last long. Brazilian forward Gustavo Manduca leveled from the penalty spot three minutes later, after Ajax defender Ricardo van Rhijn was judged to have handled inside the box when Efstathios Aloneftis tried to lift the ball over him. After the equaliser the match could have swung either way as both teams had their fair share of chances to grab all three points. On 21 October 2014, despite another excellent display against one of the continent's strongest sides, APOEL were left bitterly disappointed as they went down to a 0–1 home defeat at the hands of Paris Saint-Germain following a late Edinson Cavani goal, just three minutes before the end. APOEL more than held their own against the riches of talent that their opponents possessed and had the clearer chances of the two sides to win the match but Cavani's clever finish on 87 minutes inflicted a cruel defeat on the Cypriots, making qualification to the next round of the Champions League highly unlikely. On 5 November 2014, APOEL fell to a 1–0 defeat against Paris Saint-Germain at Parc des Princes, as Edinson Cavani was again the difference between the two teams, scoring the only goal of the match after just 56 seconds. The defeat mathematically ruled out APOEL's chances of progressing to the knockout stages of the competition, but the battle for third place was very much on. On 25 November 2014, Barcelona proved too much for APOEL as the Catalan giants cruised to a 4–0 win in a night that belonged to Lionel Messi as his hat-trick in Nicosia made him the UEFA Champions League's all-time top scorer on 74 goals. Luis Suárez put Barça ahead after 27 minutes with his first goal for the club, before Lionel Messi took centre-stage with a hat-trick, all with his less-favoured right foot. Both teams ended the match with ten players as Rafinha and João Guilherme were sent off in the second half. Despite the result, Ajax's 3–1 defeat against Paris Saint-Germain maintained APOEL one point behind the Dutch champions, giving them the chance to win their final group game in Amsterdam Arena and qualify for the knockout phase of the UEFA Europa League. On 10 December 2014, APOEL suffered a 4–0 defeat to Ajax at Amsterdam Arena in the battle for third place and were sent out of European competitions. Ajax failed to find a way through the well-drilled APOEL rearguard until the very last kick of the first half, when Lasse Schöne converted a penalty after Arkadiusz Milik was tripped in the box by Marios Antoniades. Schöne scored his second goal just after the restart and Davy Klaassen headed the third after a mazy run by teenage winger Ricardo Kishna in the 53rd minute. Polish striker Arkadiusz Milik made it 4–0 fifteen minutes from time to give Ajax its first Champions League win of the season and a berth in the UEFA Europa League round of 32. At the same time, Barcelona topped Group F by beating Paris Saint-Germain 3–1 and both teams advanced to the knockout phase of the competition, while APOEL finished fourth in Group F with just one point.

Current squad
Last Update: 21 April 2015

For recent transfers, see List of Cypriot football transfers summer 2014.
Also, see List of Cypriot football transfers winter 2014–15.

Out on loan

Loan deals expire at the end of 2014–15 season

International players

Foreign players

Squad changes

In:

Total expenditure:  €510K

Out:

Total income:  €0
{|

Club

Management

Kit

|
|
|

Other information

Squad stats

Top scorers

Last update: 24 May 2015
Source: Match reports in Competitive matches

Captains
  Constantinos Charalambides
  Nektarios Alexandrou
  Nuno Morais
  Gustavo Manduca
Source: apoelfcofficial

Pre-season friendlies
Kick-off times are in EET.

Mid-season friendlies
Kick-off times are in EET.

Competitions

Overall

Cypriot First Division

Classification

Results summary

Results by round

Play-offs
The 12 teams are divided into two groups of six teams. Points are carried over from the regular season.

Championship group

Matches
Kick-off times are in EET.

Regular season

Play-offs

UEFA Champions League

Qualifying phase

Third qualifying round

Play-off round

Group stage

Group F standings and fixtures

Matches

Cypriot Super Cup

Cypriot Cup

Second round

Quarter-finals

Semi-finals

Final

APOEL won the 2014–15 Cypriot Cup (21st title).

Notes

References

2014-15
APOEL F.C. season
2014–15 UEFA Champions League participants seasons